William Mason Fenn (15 February 1828 – 1 August 1886) was an English first-class cricketer and cleric.

The son of the Reverend Joseph Fenn, the minister of Blackheath Park Chapel, he was born at Blackheath in February 1829. He was educated at Blackheath Proprietary School, before going up to Trinity College, Cambridge. While studying at Cambridge, he played first-class cricket for Cambridge University from 1848–1851, making nine appearances. In his nine matches for Cambridge, Fenn scored 82 runs with a high score of 27, in addition to taking  wickets. In addition to playing for Cambridge, Fenn also made three first-class appearances for the Gentlemen of Kent from 1848–53, scoring 31 runs with a high score of 14.

After graduating from Cambridge, Fenn took holy orders in the Church of England in 1856. His first ecclesiastical post was as curate of Upton cum Chalvey in Buckinghamshire from 1857–58, before becoming the personal tutor to the sons of the Earl Fitzwilliam. He ceased to be employed by the Earl in 1864 when he became the rector at Tankersley, Yorkshire until 1886. Fenn is said to have declined an offer in 1885 to emigrate to Australia to become the Bishop of Brisbane. In 1885, he was employed by Eton College as a conduct master, while maintaining his rectorship at Tankersley. He died there in August 1886. His older brother Joseph was also a Church of England cleric, while his younger brother, Samuel, was also a first-class cricketer.

References

External links

1828 births
1886 deaths
People from South Oxfordshire District
People educated at Blackheath Proprietary School
Alumni of Trinity College, Cambridge
English cricketers
Cambridge University cricketers
Gentlemen of Kent cricketers
19th-century English Anglican priests